The rebel yell was a battle cry used by Confederate soldiers during the American Civil War.  

Rebel yell can also refer to:

 Rebel Yell (whiskey), a whiskey brand introduced in 1936
 Rebel Yell (roller coaster), a roller coaster premiering in 1975 at Kings Dominion near Richmond, Virginia
 Rebel Yell (album), a 1983 album by Billy Idol
"Rebel Yell" (song), the title track of the 1983 Billy Idol album
 Rebel Yell, a 2009 novel by Alice Randall.